Víctor Chávez or Victor Chavez may refer to:

Víctor Raul Díaz Chávez, Peruvian Minister of Education
Víctor Hugo Rivera Chávez, referee
Victor Chavez (The Passage), fictional character
 Victor Chavez (businessman), Chief Executive since 2011 of Thales UK